The Dobrinești is a left tributary of the river Crișul Repede in Romania. The river rises in the Izbucul Gălășeni, located on the northern part of the Ciungilor Plateau of the Pădurea Craiului Mountains. It discharges into the Crișul Repede near Aușeu.

References

Rivers of Romania
Rivers of Bihor County